Kathleen Kerrigan may refer to:
 Kathleen Kerrigan (judge)
 Kathleen Kerrigan (actress)